Glitterbug B-Sides is an EP by British indie rock band The Wombats, released in 2015. It consists of three B-sides and a remix from the recording of their album Glitterbug. The EP was released on 13 April 2015, the same day as Glitterbug, and was exclusive to HMV. It was later released digitally.

Track listing
All songs composed by The Wombats. Lyrics by Matthew Murphy.
"Right Click Save" – 3:33
"21st Century Blues" – 3:33
"Wired Differently" – 3:38
"Greek Tragedy" (Bastille Remix) – 3:54

References

The Wombats albums
2015 EPs
B-side compilation albums